The A329 is an east–west road in Southern England that runs from Wentworth in Surrey to  Thame in Oxfordshire.

Route
The A329 starts at the A30 in Surrey and passes through Ascot, Bracknell, Wokingham, Earley, Reading, Purley, Pangbourne, Lower Basildon, Streatley, Moulsford and Wallingford. It connects to junction 10 
of the M4 via the A329(M) and later to junction 7 of the M40 before finally ending at a junction with the A418 at Thame.

History
The A329 originally (in 1922) terminated at Reading.  In the 1930s it was extended to Shillingford on part of the route of the former A42.  After the M40 motorway was opened in the 1970s it was extended to Thame on the former route of the B4013.  In 1993, when the new Winterbrook Bridge enabled traffic to by-pass Wallingford, the section between Wallingford and Shillingford was downgraded to become an unclassified road.

Carriageways 
Most of the road is single carriageway, apart from the section through Bracknell, and in central Reading. In Reading the road is dualled where it forms the Inner Distribution Road. In Bracknell the A329 originally ran along the High Street (now pedestrianised) and continued west along the Wokingham Road (now B3408). Today the original London Road is dualled for a short section approaching the Met Office Roundabout. The dual carriageway then by-passes north of the pedestrianised town centre to the Giroscope Roundabout, where it crosses the former route, heading south west to the Twin Bridges roundabout and along the dual Berkshire Way to meet the old route at Amen Corner. Here the A329 continues into Wokingham on the original route, while the A329(M) by-passes to the north.

External links

SABRE information on the A329

Roads in Surrey
Roads in Oxfordshire
Roads in Berkshire